In enzymology, a trans-epoxysuccinate hydrolase is an enzyme that catalyzes the chemical reaction

trans-2,3-epoxysuccinate + H2O  meso-tartrate

Thus, the two substrates of this enzyme are trans-2,3-epoxysuccinate and H2O, whereas its product is meso-tartrate.

This enzyme belongs to the family of hydrolases, specifically those acting on ether bonds (ether hydrolases).  The systematic name of this enzyme class is trans-2,3-epoxysuccinate hydrolase. Other names in common use include trans-epoxysuccinate hydratase, and tartrate epoxydase.  This enzyme participates in glyoxylate and dicarboxylate metabolism.

References

 

EC 3.3.2
Enzymes of unknown structure